Sul (also Romanized as Sūl; also known as Sūl-e Gharbī) is a village in Jask Rural District, in the Central District of Jask County, Hormozgan Province, Iran. At the 2006 census, its population consisted of 166 people in 26 families.

References 

Populated places in Jask County